"The Need to Be" is a song written by American singer-songwriter Jim Weatherly. First recorded on the Weatherly's 1974 album “The Songs of Jim Weatherly”, the single release peaked at No. 6 on the Billboard Adult Contemporary chart, No. 11 on the Billboard Hot 100, also reaching the Top 20 on the corresponding Canadian charts.

Chart performance

Covers
Artists who have recorded cover versions of the song include:

Gladys Knight and The Pips (on their 1974 album I Feel a Song)
Ray Price (on his 1974 album You're The Best Thing That Ever Happened To Me)
Vikki Carr (on her 1974 album One Hell Of A Woman)
The Harold Wheeler Consort (on their 1975 album Black Cream)
Esther Satterfield (on her 1976 album The Need To Be)
Julie Anthony (on her 1977 album A Part Of Me)
Sandra Feva (on her 1979 album The Need To Be)
Dardanelle (on her 1982 album The Colors Of My Life)
Gayle Marie (on her 1982 album Night Rainbow)
Diana Lee (on her 1993 release Movin' Out Back)
Daniel Bernard Roumain and Ryuichi Sakamoto (on the 2008 DJ Spooky album Sound Unbound)

References

1974 singles
1974 songs
Buddah Records singles
Song recordings produced by Jimmy Bowen
Songs written by Jim Weatherly